The Nouméa Accord of 1998 is a promise by the French Republic to grant increased political power to New Caledonia and its original population, the Kanaks, over a twenty-year transition period.  It was signed 5 May 1998 by Lionel Jospin, and approved in a referendum in New Caledonia on 8 November, with 72% voting in favour. Under the accord, two more referendum votes, on whether to remain a special collectivity of France or become an independent state, have been held. One was held in 2018, and the second was held in 2020. In both votes a majority chose to remain French. The Nouméa Accord permitted a final referendum to be held, voted for by the Congress of New Caledonia. It was held December 2021 and overwhelmingly rejected independence.

Under the Nouméa Accord, France has continued to control military and foreign policy, immigration, police and currency. France will continue to do so, the vote having rejected becoming an independent state in 2021.

Named after New Caledonia's capital and largest city, the Nouméa Accord was the second accord following the Matignon Agreements (1988).

Under the conditions of the Accord, the Vice President of New Caledonia must be a pro-independence politician if the Presidency is held by an anti-independence politician.

Signatories 

The following  people signed the Nouméa Accord on 5 May 1998:

 on behalf of the French Republic:
Lionel Jospin, Prime Minister, the negotiations having been conducted on his behalf by his interior counselor Alain Christnacht,
 Jean-Jack Queyranne, secretary of state of Overseas Affairs to the Minister of the Interior, the negotiations having been conducted on his behalf by his chief of staff Thierry Lataste.
 on behalf of the Rally for Caledonia in the Republic (RPCR, anti-independence party) :
Jacques Lafleur, president of RPCR, President of the South Province Assembly and representative for the 1st electoral division of New Caledonia,
 Pierre Frogier, representative for the 2nd electoral division, 1st Vice President of the South Province Assembly and mayor of Mont-Dore,
 Simon Loueckhote, Senator from New Caledonia and elected from the Assembly of the Loyalty Islands Province and Congress of New Caledonia as well as being municipal councillor for Ouvéa,
 Harold Martin, President of the Territorial Congress, elected from the South Province Assembly and mayor of Païta,
 Jean Lèques, mayor of Nouméa, elected from the South Province Assembly and Congress,
 Bernard Deladrière, Jacques Lafleur's chief of staff.
 on behalf of the Kanak and Socialist National Liberation Front (FLNKS, pro-independence):
Rock Wamytan, unitary president of  FLNKS, member of the Caledonian Union (UC) part, Grand Chief of the Saint-Louis tribe and of the Pont-des-Français district, elected from the South Province Assembly and Congress,
Paul Néaoutyine, chief of the Party of Kanak Liberation (Palika) and the National Union for Independence (UNI) elected from the North Province Assembly and Congress as well as mayor of Poindimié
Charles Pidjot, member of the UC, nephew of former deputy Rock Pidjot,
Victor Tutugoro, spokesman for the Melanesian Progressive Union (UPM)

Popular consultation  

Popular consultation for approval of the accords was organised in New Caledonia on Sunday, 8 November 1998.

Campaign 

The local political class was divided on the question of the Nouméa agreement.

The following political figures and parties call for a "yes" vote, for reasons that are often diametrically opposed between supporters and opponents of independence:

 the two main signatories, Jacques Lafleur's RPCR (which focuses on "at least 20 years of peace and stability" and a "future in the Republic") and Rock Wamytan's FLNKS (on behalf of the general interest of the country and future generations "),
 the other two independentist movements, of moderate tradition, represented in the institutions, the Socialist Kanak Liberation Party (LKS) of Nidoïsh Naisseline ("the future of our country is at stake") and the Federation of Committees Coordinating Independents (FCCI) of Raphaël Mapou, Leopold Jorédié and François Burck ("yes to the long march of the men and women of this country, the yes to our common history so that it does not stop").
 the various mayors of Bourail and Dumbéa, respectively Jean-Pierre Aïfa and Bernard Marant, long-time opponents of the RPCR
 Delin Wema, former Kanak RPCR executive in the  North Province who became one of the leading figures in the new party Developing Together to Build the Future (DECA),
 Thierry Valet and Jean-Claude Legras, two members of Congress  from  Une Nouvelle-Calédonie pour tous (UNCT, an organisation created by dissidents from RPCR which subsequently became the principal opposition to Jacques Lafleur within the anti-independence camp), who put themselves at odds with the official position of their movement (for them, the "Yes ... reconciles at the same time the respect of the others, of their culture, their way of life and the necessary mobilization of all energies to develop the economy of New Caledonia to guarantee social progress and full employment").

The "no" side featured:

 the two main moderate anti-independence parties in opposition to RPCR: Dider Leroux's UNCT, which saw the Accord as paving the way for a "banana republic", reinforcing the hegemony of the RPCR over local political life and DECA, led by mayor of Koumac Robert Frouin, who presented the text as a "deceit" and a "Spanish farm where everyone finds what he wants to find", highlighting the differences of interpretation between the interpretations of RPCR and FLNKS.
 on the right, RPCR members opposed to autonomy, local section of the National Front (FN) such as Guy George ("I urge you to refuse abandonment and vote no") and Claude Sarran's Movement for France (MPF) ( announcing a "collusion agreement" between "the socialist government to get rid of New Caledonia, the RPCR to extend its political-financial hegemony through transfers of powers and the FLNKS to satisfy its desire for independence"), as well as former RPCR Dick Ukeiwé,
 on the left of the FLNKS, Louis Kotra Uregi's Union syndicale des travailleurs kanaks et des exploités (USTKE) who wanted immediate independence.

Results 

Source : Décision du 9 novembre 1998 proclamant les résultats de la consultation des populations de la Nouvelle-Calédonie du dimanche 8 novembre 1998

See also

 Ouvéa cave hostage taking

Further reading 

 Carine David, Victor David. 2020. "New Caledonia." in Gems of the Pacific.

References

External links 

 Details of the accord 
 Nouméa Accord 

Politics of New Caledonia
Government of New Caledonia
Treaties concluded in 1998
Treaties entered into force in 1998
Treaties of France
Treaties of New Caledonia
1998 in New Caledonia
May 1998 events in Oceania
20th century in Nouméa